We Are the Champions is a 2020 American television series about unique competitions and the people competing in them. Rainn Wilson provides narration.

References

External links
 
 

2020 American television series debuts
English-language Netflix original programming